Sarah Wheatley born Sarah Ross (1790 Saint John, New Brunswick - July 1854 New York City) was a United States stage actress.

Biography
Sarah Wheatley was born Sarah Ross in Saint John, New Brunswick. Her father, a Scottish officer, died when she was two years of age.

She made her first appearance in New York City at the Park Theatre on 12 November 1805. In 1806 she married he actor Frederick Wheatley (d. 1836) and retired from the stage; but on his failure in business, she resumed her profession for the support of her family in 1811, and continued her career with great success.  Wheatley was noted for her representations of old women.

She was the mother of the opera singer Julia Wheatley, the actor Emma Wheatley (d. 1854), and the noted actor and theatre manager William Wheatley.

Notes

References

 Thomas Allston Brown,  History of the American Stage: Containing Biographical Sketches 
 Dunlap, William, A history of the American theatre
 T. H. Morrell, Records of the New York stage, from 1750 to 1860
 Philip H. Highfill, Kalman A. Burnim, Edward A. Langhans, A Biographical Dictionary of Actors, Actresses, Musicians, Dancers, Managers

External links
  This source gives Sarah Wheatley's year of death as 1873.

1790 births
1854 deaths
19th-century American actresses
American stage actresses
Actresses from New York City